The Family Stand is an American soul and R&B group based in New York City, active since the late 1980s, consisting of Sandra St. Victor, Peter Lord Moreland, and V. Jeffrey Smith.

Evon Geffries & The Stand
Their first incarnation was called Evon Geffries & The Stand. Evon came from the name of Moreland's mother; Geffries from Jeff Smith; and The Stand, which was St. Victor's favorite book that year. The name seemed a good idea at the time, but later regretted for all the time it took in interviews to explain, and because everyone referred to St. Victor as Evon. At the suggestion of A&R man Merlin Bobb, the name was changed to more understandable, The Family Stand.

Early 1990s
The Family Stand's music tackled politics, social issues, relationship tensions, sexual tension. Their first album release was Chapters: A Novel By Evon Geffries & Stand.

Chain brought them their international hit "Ghetto Heaven", which was remixed by Nellee Hooper & Jazzy B of Soul II Soul in 1990. The group's single "Ghetto Heaven" also reached #10 in the UK Singles Chart in April 1990. At the same time The Family Stand members were largely responsible for creating the songs on Paula Abdul's album Spellbound.

Moon in Scorpio, the album that became their swan song, was released in 1991. Lord labeled the album The Family Stand's "greatest artistic achievement."

Connected
After discussion between the three, and disappointment with the lack of record company support, the group decided not to record again for the label. Lead vocalist St. Victor began to launch her solo career, and was replaced with Keith Sweat's former background vocalist Jacci McGhee in 1995. The reformed group came out with Connected.

2000s
The original trio reunited in 2006 for a concert at New York City Central Park's Summerstage, which inspired a reunion tour and new album, 2007's Super Sol Nova. Their latest release in 2010 was a single, "Story", chronicling the madness of the American justice system where an innocent boy can easily be lost. The follow-up full length project is entitled, In A Thousand Years.

In 2011, The Family Stand member V. Jeffrey Smith played bass on the song "Black Hand Side" on rapper Pharoahe Monch's 2011 album W.A.R. (We Are Renegades).

In 2013, The Family Stand contributed a track to a benefit album to raise funds for Donovan Drayton's release from prison.

Discography

Albums

Singles

References

External links
 The Family Stand website
 Sandra St.Victor website
 [ The Family Stand] at Allmusic
 The Family Stand at Discogs

American contemporary R&B musical groups